The Temco XKDT Teal was an American rocket-propelled, high-performance target drone, built by Temco Aircraft for evaluation by the United States Navy in the late 1950s. Production was not proceeded with following evaluation of the type.

Design and development
The XKDT was designed for use an inexpensive and expendable air-launched, high-performance target drone. Its design utilized a low-set swept wing, and an inverted cruciform tail; the structure of the aircraft included aluminum honeycomb wing construction and extensive use of magnesium and fiberglass in the fuselage. It was intended to reach speeds of up to Mach 0.95.

Control was provided by a three-axis autopilot; radar reflectors and infrared flares provided an assist in tracking the drone, and at the end of nine minutes' flight time a self-destruct device would be activated.

Operational history
The first flight of a XKDT-1 took place in September 1957; most flights utilized a McDonnell F3H Demon carrier aircraft.  Following the conclusion of the evaluation program, no production contract was placed; supersonic targets having become preferred.

Specifications (XKDT-1)

References

External links

KDT
1950s United States special-purpose aircraft
Low-wing aircraft
Rocket-powered aircraft
Target drones of the United States
Cancelled military aircraft projects of the United States
Aircraft first flown in 1957